Keith Leslie Broomhall (born 21 May 1951) is an English former footballer who played at left-back for Port Vale in the Football League.

Career
Broomhall joined Gordon Lee's Fourth Division side Port Vale as an apprentice in October 1967. He made a substitute appearance at Vale Park in a 1–0 win over Grimsby Town on 21 April 1969, before making his full debut a week later as right-back in a 2–0 defeat by Wrexham at the Racecourse Ground. He left on a free transfer in May 1969 and moved on to Eastwood, Burslem based Roebuck and Wolstanton United.

Career statistics
Source:

References

Sportspeople from Newcastle-under-Lyme
People from Silverdale, Staffordshire
English footballers
Association football fullbacks
Port Vale F.C. players
Eastwood Hanley F.C. players
English Football League players
1951 births
Living people